Edmonton/Villeneuve Airport or Villeneuve Airport  is located  west of Villeneuve in Sturgeon County, Alberta, Canada.

History
The airport opened in 1976, and was built by Transport Canada as a flight training facility. In 2000 the airport was purchased by Edmonton Airports.

Expansion
The closure of the Edmonton City Centre Airport has stimulated expansion of the Villeneuve Airport as a partial replacement. Villeneuve will serve as an alternate to the Edmonton International Airport for medevac flights during stormy weather.

Alberta Aviation Museum presence
Due to space constraints at the former City Centre Airport site, the Alberta Aviation Museum's Boeing 737-200 in Pacific Western Airlines (PWA) livery C-GIPW (Fleet #745) was restored to operational capability and, on 29 November 2013, was flown to Villeneuve. The 737 can be used by security agencies for training, movie productions, and aircraft pulls.

Edmonton Airshow
The award-winning Edmonton Airshow has operated from the Villeneuve Airport for four years in a row. The airshow keeps growing, now attracting up to 40,000 visitors a year. The shows remains fresh with the acts changing up year after year. Static displays and food services are growing.

Edmonton Economic Development Corporation gave the airshow the 2017 Outstanding Event award at the Edmonton Events Award Gala for the 10,000+ category, beating out Professional Bull Riding, the Canadian Finals Rodeo, and the Edmonton Folk Music Festival. In 2019 the Royal Canadian Air Force Association gave the show producer the J.A.D. McCurdy Award in recognition of outstanding and praiseworthy achievement by a Canadian in the field of civil aviation.

See also
 List of airports in the Edmonton Metropolitan Region

References

External links
 Villeneuve page at Edmonton Airports website
 Place to Fly on COPA's Places to Fly airport directory

Certified airports in Alberta
Airports established in 1976
Edmonton Airports
Edmonton Metropolitan Region
Sturgeon County